The Somerset Senior Cup is an annual rugby union knock-out club competition organised by the Somerset Rugby Football Union. First contested between 1906-07 and 1913-14, it was reintroduced during the 1970–71 season, with the winners being Bath.  It is the most important rugby union cup competition in Somerset, ahead of the Somerset Vase. 

The Senior Cup is currently open to club sides based in Somerset and parts of Bristol who play between tier 4 (National League 2 South) and tier 7 (Tribute Western Counties North) of the English rugby union league system.  A non-league 2nd XV from the University of Bath has also taken part in the competition in recent years but this is the only 2nd team to take part as the Senior Cup is only open to 1st teams. The format is a knockout cup with a first round, quarter-finals, semi-finals and a final to be held at a neutral venue between March–May.

Somerset Senior Cup winners

Number of wins
Weston-super-Mare (11)
Bridgwater & Albion (10)
Bath (6)
Hornets (5)
Old Redcliffians (4)
Taunton (3)
Combe Down (2)
Keynsham (2)
Midsomer Norton (2)
Avon & Somerset Police (1)
Clevedon (1)
North Petherton (1)
Old Culverhaysians (1)
Taunton Warriors (1)

Notes

See also
 Somerset RFU
 Somerset Senior Vase
 English rugby union system
 Rugby union in England

References

External links
 Somerset RFU

Recurring sporting events established in 1970
1970 establishments in England
Rugby union cup competitions in England
Rugby union in Somerset